Francisco Sebastián Carvajal y Gual, sometimes spelled Carbajal (December 9, 1870 – September 30, 1932) was a Mexican lawyer and politician who served briefly as president in 1914. In his role as foreign minister, he succeeded Victoriano Huerta as president upon the latter's resignation.

Biography
Born in 1870 in Campeche, Carvajal studied jurisprudence. He occupied important positions in the administration of President Porfirio Díaz. On May 3, 1911, Díaz named him as his representative at the peace conference with constitutionalist rebel Francisco I. Madero. In 1913, after Victoriano Huerta had seized power from Madero, Huerta named him president of the Supreme Court. Later (10 July 1914), Huerta named him to the cabinet as foreign minister. When Huerta resigned on 15 July, Carvajal was legally next-in-line to the presidency.

During his month-long presidential term, he oversaw the transfer of power to Venustiano Carranza and his Constitutionalist Army under the terms of the Teoloyucan Treaties. Carvajal left office on August 13, 1914; Carranza gained de facto control of the executive the following year, despite not being formally elected to the Presidency until 1917.

Carvajal left for the United States. In New Orleans, he met and married Louise Martin. They had one child, Francisco Carvajal, on October 19, 1918. He returned to Mexico City in 1922 to take up his legal profession again and died there on September 20, 1932.

See also

List of heads of state of Mexico

References

 "Carvajal, Francisco", Enciclopedia de México, vol. 6. Mexico City, 1996, .
 García Puron, Manuel, México y sus gobernantes, v. 2. Mexico City: Joaquín Porrúa, 1984.
 Orozco Linares, Fernando, Gobernantes de México. Mexico City: Panorama Editorial, 1985, .

External links
 Short biography

Presidents of Mexico
People of the Mexican Revolution
Mexican diplomats
Supreme Court of Justice of the Nation justices
Mexican Secretaries of Foreign Affairs
Politicians from Campeche City
1870 births
1932 deaths